Dominique Dord (born 1 September 1959 in Chambéry, Savoie) is a French politician of the French Republican Party who served as a member of the National Assembly of France between 1997 and 2017. He represented the Savoie department, He is also the mayor of Aix-les-Bains since 2001.

In the Republicans’ 2016 presidential primaries, Dort endorsed François Fillon as the party's candidate for the office of President of France.

References

1959 births
Living people
Politicians from Chambéry
Republican Party (France) politicians
Liberal Democracy (France) politicians
The Republicans (France) politicians
Mayors of places in Auvergne-Rhône-Alpes
Deputies of the 12th National Assembly of the French Fifth Republic
Deputies of the 13th National Assembly of the French Fifth Republic
Deputies of the 14th National Assembly of the French Fifth Republic
HEC Paris alumni
Members of Parliament for Savoie